André Lourenço e Silva (born 2 April 1976) is a Portuguese politician who is the former spokesperson of People–Animals–Nature (PAN).

Silva was born in the Lisbon parish of São Cristóvão e São Lourenço (now Santa Maria Maior) on the same day that Portugal's current constitution was enacted. He is a qualified civil engineer, and a vegetarian.

He succeeded Paulo Borges as spokesperson of PAN in October 2014. In the 2015 legislative election, he was top of the party's list in the Lisbon District, and was the first PAN representative elected to the Assembly of the Republic. This made them the first new party in parliament since the Left Bloc in 1999. He was re-elected in October 2019 along with three other members of his party, allowing them the number needed to form a parliamentary group. In March 2021, Silva announced he was leaving the leadership of the party to dedicate more time to his family.

References

1976 births
Living people
People from Lisbon
Portuguese civil engineers
Members of the Assembly of the Republic (Portugal)
People Animals Nature politicians